Someone at the Door is a British comedy thriller play by Campbell Christie and Dorothy Christie which was first staged in 1935, and ran successfully at the Aldwych, New and Comedy theatres in London's West End.

Original cast
Ronnie Martin - Henry Kendall
Bill Reid - Ivan Samson
Price - George Devine
P.C. O'Brien - Gilbert Davis
Harry Kapel, J.P. - Basil Radford
Sergeant Spedding - Walter Fitzgerald
Stranger - Frank Chaytor
Sally Martin - Diana Churchill

Adaptations
The play has been adapted twice into films. In 1936 Someone at the Door directed by Herbert Brenon and starring Aileen Marson and Billy Milton and in 1950 Someone at the Door directed by Francis Searle and starring Michael Medwin and Garry Marsh. It was also made into a 1939 television film for the BBC.

References

Bibliography
 Low, Rachael. The History of British Film. Volume VII. Routledge, 1997.

1935 plays
British plays adapted into films